Pierluigi is an Italian masculine given name meaning "Peter Louis". It is often an abbreviation of "Piero Luigi". Famous people with this given name include:

Pierluigi Balducci, Italian musician
Pierluigi Benedettini, Sammarinese footballer
Pierluigi Cappello (1967-2017), Italian poet
Pierluigi Cappelluzzo, Italian footballer
Pierluigi Carafa (1677-1755), Italian cardinal
Pierluigi Casiraghi, Italian footballer
Pierluigi Cera, Italian footballer
Pierluigi Collina, Italian football referee
Pierluigi Conforti, Italian road racer
Pierluigi Frattali, Italian footballer
Pierluigi Gollini, Italian footballer
Pierluigi Martini, Italian racing driver
Pierluigi Marzorati, Italian basketball player
Pierluigi Oliverio, American politician
Pierluigi Pairetto, Italian football referee
Pierluigi Praturlon (1924-1999), Italian photographer
Pierluigi Samaritani, Italian opera designer
Pierluigi Zappacosta, Italian businessman

See also
 Gian
 Gianluigi

Italian masculine given names